Ophelia Pastrana Ardila (born 4 October 1982) is a Colombian-Mexican transgender physicist, economist, speaker, YouTuber, technologist and comedian. She has resided in Mexico for many years.

Pastrana came out as transgender in 2012.

Honors and awards
In 2018 she was listed as one of BBC's 100 Women.

References 

1982 births
Living people
People from Bogotá
Transgender women
Colombian emigrants to Mexico
21st-century Mexican businesswomen
21st-century Mexican businesspeople
21st-century Mexican physicists
Mexican producers
Mexican transgender people
Mexican YouTubers
Colombian transgender people
Colombian YouTubers
LGBT YouTubers
Colombian producers
Colombian physicists
BBC 100 Women
20th-century Mexican LGBT people
21st-century Mexican LGBT people
20th-century Colombian LGBT people
21st-century Colombian LGBT people